Damien Fogarty (born 19 October 1985) is an Irish hurler who currently plays as a substitute forward for the Kilkenny senior team.

Fogarty made his competitive debut for the team during the 2008 National League, however, since then he has remained on the fringes of the team. He has yet to make his championship debut, however, he has won one All-Ireland winners' medal and two Leinster winners' medals as a non-playing substitute.

At club level Fogarty plays hurling with Erin's Own.

He is the son of Martin and brother of Conor.

References

1985 births
Living people
Erin's Own (Kilkenny) hurlers
UCD hurlers
Kilkenny inter-county hurlers